New Taipei Municipal San-Chung Commercial and Industrial Vocational High School  is an commercial and industrial high school district in the New Taipei City, Taiwan.

Brief Introduction  
Established in 1971, the school was originally named Taiwan Provincial San Chung Commercial and Industrial Vocational High School. 
Later, it was renamed National San Chung Commercial and Industrial Vocational High School. The school was classified into business and
industrial categories,4 departments in each at first. The main goals of the school programs and curricula were designed especially for 
those students interested in learning technical skills and seeking a job in which these skills could be applied. In 1973, to meet the 
diverse needs of students and the people in the community, the Affiliated Night Division (evening school) was added, 5 departments included. 
In 1996, the Mechanical Drawing Department was added. In 2012, the school was again renamed New Taipei Municipal San Chung Commercial and Industrial Vocational High School with the administrative region adjustments. The current principal Dr. Ching-Kui Ni manages innovative changes for SCVS and is dedicated to raising the status of SCVS as a quality vocational senior high school in the Greater Taipei.

External links 
New Taipei Municipal San-Chung Commercial and Industrial Vocational High School(Chinese)
New Taipei Municipal San-Chung Commercial and Industrial Vocational High School

1971 establishments in Taiwan
Educational institutions established in 1971
Schools in New Taipei